USCGC James (WMSL-754) is the fifth  of the United States Coast Guard.

Etymology 
USCGC James is named for Joshua James (1826–1902), an American sea captain and a U.S. Life-Saving Service station keeper credited with saving over 600 lives.

History 

Huntington Ingalls Industries, Ingalls Shipyard in Pascagoula, Mississippi was awarded the $482.8 million construction contract September 9, 2011. Construction officially began May 14, 2012 with the ceremony marking the cutting of the first 100 tons of steel. The keel was laid on May 17, 2013. The cutter's sponsor is James' great great niece, Charlene Benoit. She is the great grand daughter of Joshua James' brother, Samuel James.

James was launched on May 3, 2014. She was christened August 16, 2014 and was commissioned in Boston on August 8, 2015.

James served as a command and control platform in San Juan, Puerto Rico, Sept. 25, 2017. The cutter's crew deployed to aid in Hurricane Maria response operations and the ship's communications capabilities were used to help first responders coordinate efforts on the island.

On August 8, 2022, James was damaged when the cutter ran aground while underway. After an investigation Captain Marc Brandt was permanently relieved of duties as the commanding officer of James.

See also 
 
 
 
 
 
 Integrated Deepwater System Program

References

External links 
 

Legend-class cutters
2014 ships
Ships built in Pascagoula, Mississippi